WDEB may refer to:

 WDEB (AM), a radio station (1500 AM) licensed to Jamestown, Tennessee, United States
 WDEB-FM, a radio station (103.9 FM) licensed to Jamestown, Tennessee, United States